Mkhondo Local Municipality, is a South African local municipality situated in the Gert Sibande District Municipality, of Mpumalanga. Piet Retief is the seat of the municipality.

Main places
The 2001 census divided the municipality into the following main places:

Politics 

The municipal council consists of thirty-eight members elected by mixed-member proportional representation. Nineteen councillors are elected by first-past-the-post voting in nineteen wards, while the remaining nineteen are chosen from party lists so that the total number of party representatives is proportional to the number of votes received. In the election of 1 November 2021 the African National Congress (ANC) won a majority of twenty-one seats on the council.

The following table shows the results of the election.

References

External links
 Official Website

Local municipalities of the Gert Sibande District Municipality